The Velocity V-Twin is an American twin engined, homebuilt aircraft, designed by Velocity Aircraft and following the layout of their earlier Velocity XL but with a single vertical tail. It is the flagship model of the Velocity Aircraft Line.

Development

The Velocity V-Twin is a four-seat (with a five-seat option), retractable tricycle landing gear, composite construction aircraft with a twin engined pusher configuration and the canard layout of the Velocity XL single engine aircraft.  Its fuselage is that of the XL-RG, with the addition of the single, vertical surface which replaces the twin end plate fins of the smaller XL.

The aircraft features "gull wing" car-like doors and dual sidestick controllers.  The flight control surfaces are the same as those of the XL. The aircraft's design goal was to offer the safety of twin engines without the stall and spin risks of a conventional twin during single-engine operations. The rear-facing pusher propellers are mounted close together where the fuselage cross-section tapers, reducing asymmetrical single-engine thrust yawing compared to conventional twin-engine aircraft.

The Velocity V-Twin is unique as it will not stall with a single engine failure, instead the nose "bobbles" while the main wings remain stable, dramatically increasing flight time after engine failure.

The prototype was first flown on 13 March 2012 and appeared at Sun 'n Fun the following month.

Specifications (V-Twin)

See also

References

External links

Video of the V-Twin

Canard aircraft
Twin-engined pusher aircraft
Homebuilt aircraft
Mid-wing aircraft
Aircraft first flown in 2012